The Bolinao language or Binubolinao is a Central Luzon language spoken primarily in the municipalities of Bolinao and Anda, Pangasinan in the Philippines. It has approximately 50,000 speakers, making it the second most widely spoken Sambalic language. Most Bolinao speakers can speak Pangasinan and/or Ilocano. Ethnologue reports 510 monolinguals for this language.

Phonology
Bolinao has 21 phonemes: 16 consonants and five vowels. Syllable structure is relatively simple. Each syllable contains at least a consonant and a vowel.

Vowels
Bolinao has five vowels. They are:
 an open front unrounded vowel similar to English father
 (written as ) a mid central vowel pronounced as in English telephone
 a close front unrounded vowel similar to English machine
 a close-mid back rounded vowel similar to English forty
 a close back rounded vowel similar to English flute

Consonants
Below is a chart of Bolinao consonants. All the stops are unaspirated. The velar nasal occurs in all positions including at the beginning of a word.

Language comparison
A common proverb from Filipino hero Jose Rizal in English, "He who does not acknowledge his beginnings will not reach his destination," is translated into Bolinao, followed by the provincial language Pangasinan, the regional language Ilocano, and the original in Tagalog for comparison:

See also
Languages of the Philippines

References

External links

Binubolinao.com, website dedicated to the preservation of the Bolinao language.
bolinao.webonary.org, an online Binubolinao or Bolinao dictionary.

Sambalic languages
Languages of Pangasinan